Adineh Masjed-e Pain (also Romanized as Ādīneh Masjed-e Pā’īn; also known as Ādīneh Masjed-e Soflá) is a village in Zalian Rural District, Zalian District, Shazand County, Markazi Province, Iran. At the 2006 census, its population was 105, in 30 families.

References 

Populated places in Shazand County